Tālā (stylized as TĀLĀ) is the stage name of London-based musician Jasmin Tadjiky. She was raised in Kingston, South London, and attended a catholic school in Twickenham until she was 16, when she attended the BRIT School. She started learning to play music with piano lessons, jamming with her sitar- and tabla-playing father. She started making electronic music after being given the Reason music software as a teenager. TĀLĀ is not her real name, but rather chosen for its meaning ('gold' in Persian).

She is heavily influenced by modern pop and electronic music. Her debut performance was as a support vocalist for T.Williams on a track called "On My Own" in 2013. TĀLĀ released two records in 2014: her first extended play, The Duchess, and a single through the independent Aesop label. She was then signed up to Columbia Records and released a further EP, Alchemy, in November 2014.

The video for the track "Serbia" was produced with Katia Danfield. Filmed in Morocco, the video was filmed on a shoestring budget and features the girls' sight-seeing.

TĀLĀ was featured on BBC1 by Alice Levine and Phil Taggart and was championed by the producer SOHN. She went on to feature in Channel 4's Future Sounds and Vevo's DSCVR in 2016. Her collaborative Malika EP saw TĀLĀ travel to Cairo, Istanbul and New York and included collaborations with Egyptian rappers Sadat & Alaa Fifty and US Alt-RnB star BANKS.  In 2015, she began performing live gigs which included sold out headline shows at The Courtyard Theatre and The ICA as well as Field Day, Pitch and Club2Club Festivals.

2018 she parted ways with Columbia Records and formed her own label The Duchess Records where she release several singles and developed sample packs with Splice. In 2020 TĀLĀ began work Executively Producing BANKS' 4th studio album 'Serpentina' which was released on 8th April 2022. TĀLĀ has also written music for Eddie Huang produced movie 'Boogie', Adidas' 'Watch Us Move Campaign' and is currently working with the British Council on a collaborative project with artists from Indonesia to be release in May 2022.

Discography

Extended plays
 The Duchess (2014)
 Alchemy (2014) 
 Malika (2015)
 Zāl (2016)

Singles
 "Wolfpack"  (2015)
 "Talk 2 Me" (2016)
 "Stay Here in the Sun"  (2018)
 "Bedtime" (2018)
 "On Top" (2018)
 "Birthday Cake" (2018)
 "Cabin Fever" (2021)

Producer
"Misunderstood" BANKS (2022)
"Meteorite" BANKS (2022)
"Fuck Love" BANKS (2022)
"Holding Back" BANKS (2022)
"Burn" BANKS (2022)
"Spirit" BANKS (2022)
"Anything 4 U" BANKS (2022)

Executive Producer
 "Serpentina" BANKS (2022)

Remixes
Better Days (TĀLĀ Remix) - Dermot Kennedy (2021)
ALL IN (TĀLĀ Remix) - Lunakai (2021)
"Blame Fire" (TĀLĀ Remix) - Petite Noir (2019)
"Rise" (TĀLĀ Remix) - Katy Perry (2016)

Features
"What You Saying?" - Jarreau Vandal (2018)

References

External links
 

Musicians from London
English electronic musicians
1989 births
Living people
English women in electronic music